Christian Hinrich Siuts (born 21 July 1932) is a German folklorist.

Life 
Born in Stargard, Siuts studied folklore, history and German literature at the Ludwig-Maximilians-Universität München, the Eberhard Karls Universität Tübingen and in Kiel. In 1956 he received his doctorate in ethnology from the Christian-Albrechts-Universität zu Kiel.

After his studies, Siuts first worked at the Deutsches Volksliedarchiv, where he mainly recorded and archived traditional songs.

In 1962 he got a job as a research assistant at the Folklore Department of the University of Münster, where he habilitated in 1968 with a thesis on hymnal songs for the calendar festivals. In 1971 he was offered a chair at the Institute for Folklore at the University of Münster.

Work 
 Bann und Acht und ihre Grundlagen im Totenglauben. De Gruyter, Berlin 1959 (Zugleich Dissertation at the University of Kiel (1956).
 Die Ansingelieder zu den Kalenderfesten : ein Beitrag zur Geschichte, Biologie und Funktion des Volksliedes
 Die Ansingelieder zu den Kalenderfesten. Ein Beitrag zur Geschichte, Biologie und Funktion des Volksliedes. Schwartz, Göttingen 1968 (at the same time habilitation thesis at the University of Münster)
 Deutsch-niederländische Kulturverflechtungen bei den Ansingeliedern zu den Kalenderfesten]
 Bäuerliche und handwerkliche Arbeitsgeräte in Westfalen : die alten Geräte der Landwirtschaft und des Landhandwerks 1890-1930.  Aschendorff, Münster 1982.
 Bäuerliche und handwerkliche Arbeitsgeräte in Westfalen. Aschendorff, Münster 1982, .
 Bauern und Landhandwerker in Ostfriesland. Eine Darstellung aufgrund der Erhebungen von Bernhard Klocke 1979 – 1984. Museumsdorf Cloppenburg, Cloppenburg 2004.

Literatur 
 Ruth-Elisabeth Mohrmann: Volkskunde im Spannungsfeld zwischen Universität und Museum. Festschrift for Hinrich Siuts on his 65th birthday. Waxmann, Münster 1997,  (Beiträge zur Volkskultur in Nordwestdeutschland, vol. 95).

References

External links 
 

Academic staff of the University of Münster
German folklorists
1932 births
Living people
People from Stargard